Oleg Pavlovich Tabakov (17 August 1935 – 12 March 2018) was a Soviet and Russian actor and the Artistic Director of the Moscow Art Theatre. People's Artist of the USSR (1988).

Biography
Tabakov was born in Saratov into a family of doctors. His paternal great-grandfather, Ivan Ivanovich Utin, came from serfs and was raised in a wealthy peasant family under the Tabakov surname. His grandfather, Kondratiy Tabakov, worked as a locksmith in Saratov where he built himself a house and married a local commoner Anna Konstantinovna Matveeva. Oleg's father, Pavel Kondratievich Tabakov, worked at the State Regional Research Institute of Epidemiology and Microbiology "Microbe" in Saratov.

His maternal grandfather, Andrei Frantzevich Piontkovsky, was a Polish nobleman who owned lands in the Podolia Governorate and married a local villager, Olga Terentievna (surname unknown) of Ukrainian origin. Oleg's mother, Maria Andreevna Berezovskaya (née Piontkovskaya), was a radiologist. She had a daughter Mirra from the previous marriage to Gugo Goldstern, a high-ranking Soviet functionary and intelligence officer killed in the line of duty.

During the Great Patriotic War, Oleg's father volunteered for the frontline and served aboard a hospital train while his mother was evacuated to Ural along with children where she also worked in a military hospital. After the war, the parents separated.

Theatre career
Tabakov studied at the Moscow Art Theatre School. Upon graduating, he became one of the founding fathers of the Sovremennik Theatre. He administrated the Sovremennik until 1982, when he moved to the Moscow Art Theatre, where he has played Molière and Salieri for over 20 years. In 1986, Tabakov persuaded his students to form the Tabakov Studio attached to the Moscow Art Theatre. Among those who studied at the studio were Russian actors Yevgeny Mironov, Sergey Bezrukov, Vladimir Mashkov, Andrey Smolyakov and Alexandre Marine, and American actor Jon Bernthal. Tabakov also worked in numerous foreign countries, spreading his theatre's ideals, notably Stanislavski's system, abroad.

Film career
Tabakov's movie career paralleled the theatrical. He was featured in Grigori Chukhrai's Clear Skies (1961), Sergei Bondarchuk's War and Peace (1966–67), TV series Seventeen Moments of Spring (1973) and D'Artagnan and Three Musketeers (1978), the Academy Award-winning Moscow Does Not Believe In Tears (1980), Nikita Mikhalkov's Oblomov (1981) and Dark Eyes (1986), and the mock red western A Man from the Boulevard des Capuchines (1987), among others.

Voice-over work
Tabakov has lent his distinctive, purr-like voice to a number of animated characters, including the talking cat Matroskin in Three from Prostokvashino and its sequels. After the Matroskin role, he dubbed the character of Garfield into Russian in the feature film Garfield and its sequel.

Political activism
During the 2012 Russian presidential election, Tabakov was registered as a "Trusted Representative" (Доверенное Лицо) of Vladimir Putin.

In March 2014, he signed a letter in support of the position of the President of Russia Vladimir Putin on Russia's military intervention in Ukraine. In September 2014, Tabakov claimed that Crimea has no relation to Ukraine and upbraided Ukrainians for discussing it: "But all happened fairly. If our Ukrainian brothers were smarter, they would not discuss that topic. They had to say: "Forgive us for God's sake! We had encroached the gravy train." Because Crimea has no relation to dependent, nor independent Ukraine." Crimea is, since March 2014, under dispute by Russia and Ukraine.

Honours and awards

 
Order "For Merit to the Fatherland";
1st class (17 August 2010) – for outstanding contributions to the development of domestic theatrical art and many years of creative activity
2nd class (17 August 2005) – for outstanding contribution to the development of theatrical art, and many years of creative activity
3rd class (23 October 1998) – for many years of fruitful work in the field of theatrical art, and in connection with the 100th anniversary of the Moscow Art Theatre
4th class (29 June 2015)
Order of Friendship of Peoples (10 November 1993) – for his great personal contribution to the development of theatrical art, and training qualified personnel for theatre and film
Order of the Red Banner of Labour (USSR, 1982)
Order of the Badge of Honour (USSR, 1967)
 USSR State Prize (1967)
 State Prize of the Russian Federation (1997)
Honored Artist of the RSFSR (1969)
 People's Artist of the RSFSR (1977)
 People's Artist of the USSR (1988)
 Honorary Member of the Russian Academy of Arts (8 October 2008)
 Golden Mask Award (1995)
 Seagull Theatre Prize
 Crystal Turandot Award
 Russian Presidential Prize for Literature and the Arts (2003)
 Moscow Komsomol Prize (1967)
 Moscow Mayor's Award for Literature and the Arts (1997)
 Diploma of the Moscow City Duma (2008)
 Medal "For Valiant Labour" (Tatarstan, 2010)
 Honorary Citizen of the Republic of Mordovia (2010), Saratov Oblast (2010), City of Saratov (2003)
 Order "Key of Friendship" (Kemerovo Oblast, 2010)
 Medal "For Faith and Good" (Kemerovo Oblast, 2011)
Order of the Cross of Terra Mariana, 3rd class (Estonia, 2005)
 Officer of the Legion of Honor (France, 2013)

Selected filmography

Sasha Enters Life (1957) as Sasha Komelev
The Variegateds Case (1958) as Igor Peresvetov
Nakanune (1959) as Shubin
People on the Bridge (1960) as Viktor Bulygin
Probation (1960) as Sasha Yegorov
The Buzzy Day (1960) as Oleg
Clear Skies (1961) as Seryozhka
Molodo-zeleno (1962) as Nikolai Babushkin
The Alive and the Dead (1964) as Krutikov
War and Peace (1965–1967, part 1-4) as Nikolai Rostov
Doroga k moryu (1965) as Chemezov
The Bridge Is Built (1966) as Sergei Zaytsev
A Pistol Shot (1967) as Belkin
Shtrikhi k portretu (1967) as Nikolai Bukharin
Korol manezha (1970)
Shine, Shine, My Star (Gori, gori, moya zvezda) (1970) as Vladimir Iskremas
The Secret of the Iron Door (1970) as Father
King Stag (1970) as Cigolotti
The Polynin Case (1970) as Viktor Balakirev
Serdtse Rossii (1970) as Usiyevich
Property of the Republic (1972) as Makar Ovchinnikov
Ekhali v tramvaye Ilf i Petrov (1972)
Malchiki (1972) (uncredited)
Dacha (1973) as Yuri
Seventeen Instants of Spring (1973, TV Series) as Walter Schellenberg
Menyayu sobaku na parovoz (1975) as The Director
Mark Twain Says No (1975, TV Movie) as Mark Twain
How Czar Peter the Great Married Off His Moor (1976) as Yeguzhinskiy
Practical Joke (1977) as otets Komarovskogo
An Unfinished Piece for Mechanical Piano (1977) as Pavel Petrovich Shcherbuk
Lone Wolf (1978) as Bersenev
Three from Prostokvashino (1978, Short) as Matroskin the Cat (voice)
Nakanune premiery (1978) as Patov
D'Artagnan and Three Musketeers (1979, TV Mini-Series) as King Louis XIII
Moscow Does Not Believe In Tears (1980) as Vladimir, Katerina's lover
A Few Days from the Life of I. I. Oblomov (1980) as Ilya Ilyich Oblomov
Nezvanyy drug (1981) as Aleksey Grekov
The Vacancy (1981) as Yusov
Everything's the Wrong Way (1982) as Yermakov, papa
Polyoty vo sne i nayavu (1983) as Nikolay Pavlovich
Good Bye, Mary Poppins (1984, TV Movie) as Miss Andrew
Oglyanis!... (1984) as Yuriy Nikolayevich
Yesli mozhesh, prosti... (1984) as Stepan Kuzmich
Time and the Conways (1984) as Robin (Adult)
Kukacka v temném lese (1985) as Otto Kukuck
Applause, Applause... (1985) as Sergey Shevtsov
Gorod nevest (1985) as Reutov
Korabl prisheltsev (1985) as Constructor
After the Rain, on Thursday (1985) as Koschei the Immortal
Puteshestviye gospodina Perrishona (1986) as Perrishon
Konets sveta s posleduyushchim simpoziumom (1987) as Paul Cohen
Dark Eyes (1987) as Sua Grazia
A Man from the Boulevard des Capuchines (1987) as Harry
Raz, dva - gore ne beda (1988) as Czar Ivan
Dorogoe udovolstvie (1988) as Syoma
Shag (1989) as Tutunov
Love with Privileges (1989) as Nikolay Petrovich, KGB General
Iskusstvo zhit v Odesse (1989) as Tsudechkis
It (1989) as Brudasty
Tsarskaya okhota (1990) as Golitsyn
Shapka (1990) as Andrey Andreyevich Shchupov
The Inner Circle (1991) as Vlasik
Choknutye (1991)
Stalin (1992) as doctor Vinogradov
Khochu v Ameriku (1993)
Moscow Vacation (1995) as Maurizio
Shirli-Myrli (1995) as Sukhodrishchev
Belye dyuny (1996)
Three Stories (1997) as Old Man
Sympathy Seeker (1997) as Cook
Quadrille (1999) as Sanya Arefyev
The President and His Granddaughter (2000) as President
Podari mne lunnyy svet (2001)
Taking Sides (2001) as Colonel Dymshitz
Ledi na den (2002) as mayor of New York
The State Counsellor (2005) as Prince Dolgoroukoy
Yesenin (2005, TV Mini-Series) as KGB General Simagin
Dopolnitelnoe vremya (2005)
Relatives (2006) as Polgármester
Andersen. Zhizn bez lyubvi (2006) as Meisling
Ilya Muromets and Solovey Razboynik (2007) as Vasilevs (voice)
Melodiya dlya sharmanki (2009)
Yolki 2 (2011)
Poklonnitsa (2012)
Tot eshchyo Karloson! (2012) as Stareyshina Metrikov
Vechnoe vozvrashchenie (2012)
Buratino's Return (2013) as Mr. Baskara (voice)
Kukhnya v Parizhe (2014)
Kitchen. The Last Battle (2017) as Pyotr Barinov

References

External links

Tabakov Theatre in Moscow
Tabakov's webpage on the website of the Moscow Art Theatre
Complete filmography
Tabakov Biography on Lifeactor.ru

1935 births
2018 deaths
20th-century Russian male actors
21st-century Russian male actors
Actors from Saratov
Academicians of the National Academy of Motion Picture Arts and Sciences of Russia
Communist Party of the Soviet Union members
Moscow Art Theatre School alumni
Academic staff of Moscow Art Theatre School
Academic staff of High Courses for Scriptwriters and Film Directors
Honorary Members of the Russian Academy of Arts
Russian  theatre directors
Honored Artists of the RSFSR
People's Artists of the RSFSR
People's Artists of the USSR
Recipients of the Legion of Honour
Full Cavaliers of the Order "For Merit to the Fatherland"
Recipients of the Order of Friendship of Peoples
Recipients of the Order of the Cross of Terra Mariana, 3rd Class
Recipients of the Order of the Red Banner of Labour
Recipients of the USSR State Prize
Russian male film actors
Russian male stage actors
Russian male television actors
Russian male voice actors
Soviet male film actors
Soviet male stage actors
Soviet male television actors
Soviet male voice actors
Deaths from sepsis
Burials at Novodevichy Cemetery
Soviet theatre directors